Melton Town Football Club is a football club based in Melton Mowbray, Leicestershire, England.

History
The club was established in 2004 and joined Division Two of the Leicester & District League. In 2006–07 season they were Division Two champions, and were promoted to Division One. In 2009 they moved up to Division One of the  Leicestershire Senior League. After finishing as runners-up in 2012–13, the club were promoted to the Premier Division. They went on to finish as runners-up in the Premier Division in 2013–14 and 2014–15, but were unable to take promotion due to failing ground grading regulations. A third-place finish in 2015–16 and a move to a new ground saw the club promoted to Division One of the United Counties League, with the club also being renamed Melton Town.

In 2021 Melton were promoted to the Premier Division North based on their results in the abandoned 2019–20 and 2020–21 seasons.

Ground
In 2013 the club moved to nearby Asfordby. They returned to Melton Mowbray in April 2016 when the club moved to the Melton Sports Village. The new ground included a 135-seat stand. In autumn 2021 an artificial pitch was installed.

Honours
Leicester & District League
Division Two champions 2006–07

Records
Best FA Vase performance: Second qualifying round, 2017–18

See also
Melton Town F.C. players
Melton Town F.C. managers

References

External links
Official website

 
Football clubs in England
Football clubs in Leicestershire
Association football clubs established in 2004
2004 establishments in England
Melton Mowbray
Leicester and District Football League
Leicestershire Senior League
United Counties League